Hyl or HYL may refer to:
 
 Helsingin yhteislyseo, a school in Kontula, Helsinki, Finland
 Hydroxylysine, an amino acid
 HYL, the IATA code for Hollis Seaplane Base, Alaska, US
 HYL, the National Rail code for Hayle railway station, Cornwall, UK
 Hyl (unit) or metric slug, a unit of mass
 Nils Hylander (1904–1970), Swedish botanist, author abbreviation

See also